Andrew Maurice Simpkins (born April 29, 1983) is a former American football linebacker. Simpkins played college football at Catawba College but followed Catawba head coach David Bennett to Coastal Carolina University to finish his college career. He was one of Coastal Carolina's first-ever First-team All-Big South players.

Professional career

Green Bay Blizzard
He was signed in 2010 by the Green Bay Blizzard of the Indoor Football League. Simpkins made a big impact on the team in the first year earning him the honors of the IFL 2010 Most Improved Player award.

Green Bay Packers
On August 10, 2010 the Green Bay Packers signed Simpkins as an undrafted free agent.
Simpkins was signed to the practice squad to start the 2010 season but on October 7, 2010, Simpkins was moved to the Green Bay Packers 53-man active roster. Simpkins was released from the Green Bay Packers on October 26, 2010, after appearing in two games.

St. Louis Rams
On December 7, 2010 Simpkins was signed to the St. Louis Rams practice squad. He was waived on August 3, 2011.

Nebraska Danger
Simpkins signed with the Nebraska Danger of the Indoor Football League for the 2013 season. He was released on June 5, 2013.

Personal life
After retiring from professional football, Simpkins started a tech consulting firm.

Statistics

Sources:

References

External links
Coastal Carolina Chanticleers bio
Green Bay Packers bio
"The 10 Least Consequential Athletes of the Decade" by Jon Bois, for SB Nation

Living people
1983 births
Players of American football from South Carolina
American football linebackers
Catawba Indians football players
Coastal Carolina Chanticleers football players
Rock River Raptors players
Green Bay Blizzard players
Green Bay Packers players
St. Louis Rams players
Nebraska Danger players
People from Batesburg-Leesville, South Carolina